Six cities submitted bids to host the 1996 Summer Olympics (formally known as Games of the XXVI Olympiad), which were awarded to Atlanta, on September 18, 1990. The other candidate cities were Athens (Greece), Toronto (Canada), Melbourne (Australia), Manchester (United Kingdom) and Belgrade (Yugoslavia).

Results

Background
Atlanta was selected by the USOC over bids from Nashville, San Francisco and runner-up Minneapolis to be the U.S. representative in international bidding. The city entered the competition as a dark horse, being up against stiff competition. The US media also criticized it as a second-tier city and complained of Georgia's Confederate history. However, the IOC Evaluation Commission ranked Atlanta's infrastructure and facilities the highest, while IOC members said that it could guarantee large television revenues similar to the success of the 1984 Summer Olympics in Los Angeles. Additionally, former US ambassador to the UN and Atlanta mayor Andrew Jackson Young touted Atlanta's civil rights history and reputation for racial harmony. Young also wanted to showcase a reformed and modernized American South. The strong economy of Atlanta and improved race relations in the South helped to impress the IOC officials. The Atlanta Committee for the Olympic Games (ACOG) also proposed a substantial revenue-sharing with the IOC, USOC, and other NOCs.

Greece, the home of the ancient and first modern Olympics, was considered by many observers the "natural choice" for the Centennial Games. However, Athens bid chairman Spyros Metaxa demanded that it be named as the site of the Olympics because of its "historical right due to its history", which may have caused resentment among delegates. Furthermore, the Athens bid was described as "arrogant and poorly prepared", being regarded as "not being up to the task of coping with the modern and risk-prone extravaganza" of the current Games. Athens faced numerous obstacles, including "political instability, potential security problems, air pollution, traffic congestion and the fact that it would have to spend about $3 billion to improve its infrastructure of airports, roads, rail lines and other amenities".

Allegations were quick to emerge in the Greek and Australian media that Atlanta had won the Games due to a conspiracy organized by global beverage company Coca-Cola, a longtime sponsor of the Olympic Games headquartered in Atlanta. An Athenian daily newspaper declared the "Olympic flame will not be lit with oil, but with Coca-Cola", while the Athens bid chair said that the city would never again bid for the Games (a promise that was not carried out eventually, as Athens went on to host the 2004 Summer Olympics). Coca-Cola executives, however, had feared that a successful Atlanta bid would hurt their business. While they produced commemorative pins of the six candidate cities, with the intent of handing out the winning city's pins to IOC delegates, this backfired as others alleged that Coca-Cola had predicted which city had won; indeed sales of the beverage in Greece dropped for the next few years. A year later, an article appeared in the German periodical Der Spiegel accusing the Atlanta Committee for the Olympic Games (ACOG) of bribing IOC members with up to $120,000 in cash, gold credit cards and college scholarships for their children. In one case, allegations that Atlanta had promised free heart surgery to IOC members coincided with reports that an IOC official had suffered a heart attack while visiting the city, with the medical expenses covered by ACOG as a "professional courtesy". In his defense, ACOG Chairman Billy Payne said, "Atlanta's bidding effort included excessive actions, even thought processes, that today seem inappropriate but, at the time, reflected the prevailing practices in the selection process and an extremely competitive environment." Indeed, these practices were widespread among cities wishing to host an Olympics, right up until the IOC scandal broke in 1998. The competing cities spent a total of over $100 million campaigning for the right to host the Summer Games, of which Atlanta spent $7.3 million.

References

1996
1996 Summer Olympics
September 1990 events in Asia
1990 in Tokyo
Events in Tokyo